The Central Institute of Hindi ( Kendrīya Hindī Sansthān) is an institution that promotes the Hindi language in India. It is run by the Ministry of Human Resource Development of the Government of India. It was established in 1960 by the Department of Higher Education, engaged in teaching of Hindi as a foreign and second language. It is headquartered in Agra.

Apart from conducting regular and residential Hindi language courses for foreign students, the institute also conducts regular teacher-training programmes for teachers of Hindi belonging to various states of India. The institute is situated at an  campus on the outskirts of Agra city. The institute further has eight regional centers in Delhi, Hyderabad, Mysore, Shillong, Dimapur, Guwahati, Ahmedabad and Bhubaneswar. The institute is the only government-run institution in India established solely for research and teaching of Hindi as a foreign and second language.

History
On 19 March 1960, the Ministry of Education of India established the All-Indian Hindi Education College ( Akhil Bhārtīy Hindī Śikṣaṇ Mahāvidyālay). On 1 November 1960 the body was officially registered per the Societies Registration Act. The first chairman of this body was notable Indian independence activity and promoter of Hindi Moturi Satyanarayana.

It was renamed the Central Institute of Hindi in 1963.

Leadership

Teaching Programmes
Kendriya Hindi Sansthan, Agra has been instrumental in propagation of Hindi in national and international spheres. The Institute has been recognized as a world level institution for teaching, learning and research on Hindi. The institute is committed towards propagation of Hindi on national level, establishing Hindi as medium of multi-cultural society of India, and provide for advanced study of different Indian Languages in relation to Hindi language and literature, in order to further the active role of Hindi in national unity and integration.

In addition, the institute has affiliated Colleges namely Mizoram Hindi Teachers Training Institute, Aizawl (Mizoram); Govt. Teachers Training Institute, Dimapur (Nagaland); Hindi Teachers Training College, Mysore (Karnataka); Govt. Hindi Teachers Training College, Guwahati (Assam). Institute's courses are run by these Institutions including conduction of their admissions and examinations. At present the institute is running 13 training and teaching programmes. Till date 68,129 students (data until July 2012) have been trained under 26 programmes. Around 3612 foreign students from 71 countries have received diplomas under the scheme of Propagation of Hindi Abroad. The following programmes are being conducted by Central Institute of Hindi:

Hindi Teachers Training Programmes

Short Term Courses (Orientation and Refresher Courses)
Till date 42,750 teacher-trainees have received training under this programme. Institute strives to train 2700 in-service Hindi teachers through its 50 programmes every year.

International Hindi Teaching Program (under Propagation of Hindi Abroad Scheme)

Vocational courses (evening programmes) Regional students
These programmes are being conducted at Agra and Delhi.

Research and study

Seminars and Workshops
Kendriya Hindi Sansthan organizes various National seminars and  short budget seminars on Hindi language, literature and language teaching, language technology etc. at its headquarter and regional centers.

Preparation of Digital Language teaching and Learning Materials
Kendriya Hindi Sansthan has a digital language lab and audio recording studio. Institute is producing various digital teaching and learning materials by making use of information and language technology.

Lexical Resources
For enriching the Hindi Vocabulary and preserve dialects of Hindi language, the Institute undertakes various programmes viz., preparation of ‘Lok shabdkosh’ and ‘Corpora’ (Corpus of Hindi language) and ‘Collection of Folk Literature from North-Eastern India’. Under this programme, Brajbhasha-Hindi-English Lok shabdkosh, Marwari-Hindi-English Lokshabdkosh, Awadhi-Hindi- English Lok shabdkosh, Bundeli-Hindi-English Lok shabdkosh are under preparation. Digital and printed Bhojpuri-Hindi-English Lok Shabdkosh was published in the year 2009.

Department of Instructional Material Production
The programme of this department depends on researches done in regional languages. The data collected is utilized in preparation of Hindi textbooks for second/other language learners . This department also undertakes on requests of several State Governments for preparation of Hindi textbooks. Kendriya Hindi Sansthan has prepared these instructional materials for the State of Mizoram, Meghalaya, Nagaland and Sikkim. The materials are published and taught in the schools of State Governments. Under these Instructional material,

1. Text-books, 2. Learners Dictionary, 3. Learner's Grammar and Teacher's handbook are prepared. Institute has also prepared Instructional Material for 5 tribal dialects (Kurukh, Halbi, Godi, Korku and Bheeli) of MP and Chhattisgarh keeping in view the problem of second language learners.

Publications

The department of publication has published nearly 100 titles out of which some are the collections of articles presented in the seminars. Institute publishes six journals and magazines regularly: 1. Research Journal ‘Gaveshna’ (गवेषणा), 2. Media, 3. ‘Samanvay Purvottar’, 3. Vishva Bharti, 5. Samanvay, 6. Sansthan Samachar.

Library

The library of the institute has one of the best collections  of books on Hindi language, literature and learning. There are 50,000 titles under the head of applied linguistics, comparative literature, manuscripts and applied Hindi education. The regional centers of the institute are also developing their own libraries.

Awards

Each year Kendriya Hindi Sansthan organizes various awards under ‘Hindi Sevi Samman Yojana’ in seven categories. These awards are conferred by the President of India to the people who have contributed in the propagation and enrichment of Hindi language in India and abroad. The categories of awards are as follows: (1) Gangasharan Singh Award, (2) Ganesh Shankar Vidyarthi Award, (3) Atmaram Award, (4) Subrahmanyam Bharti Award, (5) Mahapandit Rahul Sankrutyayan Award, (6) Dr George Abraham Grierson  Award, (7)Padma Bhushan Dr Moturi Satyanarayan Award. This awards are conferred each year on world Hindi day (10 January).

References

External links
 Official Website

Ministry of Education (India)
1960 establishments in Uttar Pradesh
Government agencies established in 1960
Hindi
Language advocacy organizations